Waynesfield-Goshen Local Schools is a public high school that is located in Waynesfield, Ohio. Waynesfield, Ohio Located in northwestern Ohio of Auglaize County, Ohio.Their nickname is the tigers and their colors are blue and gold. Waynesfield-Goshen Local Schools, has a strong tradition of academic, athletic, artistic and music success. The school district serves students from the Villages of Waynesfield and New Hampshire, as well as parts of Wayne and Goshen Townships, and parts of Union and Clay Townships.

Academics 
Waynesfield-Goshen Local Schools is a fully accredited high school, meeting all secondary school requirements of both the state of Ohio and North Central Educational Association. Waynesfield-Goshen faculty have been noted for their excellence in the classroom. In 2012, the Gilder Lehrman Institute of American History selected Joe Foster as the History Teacher of the Year for the state of Ohio. Foster was again honored in 2014, this time as National Teacher of the Year by the Civil War Trust. Math teacher Kathy Lament was recognized as the 2017 Teacher of the Year for State Board of Education District 1.

Performing arts 
Waynesfield-Goshen is also home to:
 Marching Band
 Concert Band
 Concert Choir 
 Musical/Theater

Athletics 
Waynesfield-Goshen Local Schools competes in the Northwest Central Conference in Ohio.

Sports Offered

Ohio High School Athletic Association State Championships
 Boys Track and Field – 2006

OHSAA State Champions 
 2012 Girls 100 meter hurdles State Champion – Ivy Horn
 2011 Girls 400 meter relay State Champions- Abbey Gray, Morgan Horn, Frankie James, Ivy Horn
 2008 Boys Long Jump State Champion – Gray Horn
 2006 Boys 800 meter relay State Champions – Joe Neal Horn, Gray Horn, Kellen Fetter, Jesse Norris
 2006 Boys 100 meter dash State Champion – Joe Neal Horn
 2006 Boys 200 meter dash State Champion – Joe Neal Horn
 2006 Boys 400 meter dash State Champion – Joe Neal Horn
 2006 Boys Pole Vault State Champion – Gray Horn
 2001 Boys 300 hurdles (39″) State Champion – Doug Endel
 1929 Boys Discus State Champion – Joe Ashley Horn

Ohio High School Athletic Association State Runner-Up 
 Girls Track & field - 2012
Further Information: Ohio High School Athletic Association

OHSAA State Runner-Up 
 2012 Girls Long Jump State Runner-Up – Ivy Horn
 2011 Girls 100 Meter Dash State Runner-Up – Ivy Horn
 2007 Boys High Jump State Runner-Up – Gray Horn
 2007 Boys Pole Vault State Runner-Up – Gray Horn
 2007 Boys 110 meter hurdles State Runner-Up – Gray Horn
 2002 Girls 300 Meter Low Hurdles State Runner-Up – Jenny Endel
 1984 Boys 110 meter hurdles State Runner-Up – Todd Miller

Notable alumni
 Bob Ewing was a Major League Baseball Pitcher. He played in the majors from 1902 to 1912 Cincinnati Reds, Philadelphia Phillies, and St. Louis Cardinals.
 Gray Horn heptathlon champion at 2014 USA Indoor Track and Field Championships and Bronze Medalist at the 2012 US Olympic Trials.
 Joe Neal Horn was a former National Football League Wide receiver for the Indianapolis Colts. Signed as a Free Agent. He also spent time in the Canadian Football League for the Calgary Stampeders and the Arena Football League for the Cleveland Gladiators and Tampa Bay Storm.

Notes and references

External links
 District Website

High schools in Auglaize County, Ohio
Public high schools in Ohio